The Grimes Homestead, also known as Grimes Farm, is a historic home in Mountain Lakes, Morris County, New Jersey, United States. It was constructed in the late 18th Century and served as a way station on the Underground Railroad for runaway slaves.

Anti-slavery advocate and Quaker, Dr. John Grimes (1802–1875), was born in this house and lived here until 1828.  He moved back to the homestead in 1832, but subsequently moved to the neighboring community of Boonton.  He was once arrested for hiding a runaway slave, and was repeatedly harassed by supporters of slavery. The house is now privately owned, and is not open to the public.

See also
 List of Underground Railroad sites
 National Register of Historic Places listings in Morris County, New Jersey

References

External links
 NPS Grimes Homestead

Houses in Morris County, New Jersey
Houses on the Underground Railroad
Houses on the National Register of Historic Places in New Jersey
Mountain Lakes, New Jersey
National Register of Historic Places in Morris County, New Jersey
Populated places on the Underground Railroad
Birthplaces of individual people